

National nursing organizations
The Trained Nurses' Association of India  
United Nurses Association (India)
Alliance of Young Nurse Leaders and Advocates
American Nurses Association
An Bord Altranais
Canadian Indigenous Nurses Association
Canadian Nurses Association
Japanese Nursing Association
Nursing Council of Kenya (Nursing in Kenya)
Nursing Association of Nepal
Indian nurses association (India)
Nursing Council of New Zealand
Nursing and Midwifery Council
New Zealand Nurses Organisation
Philippine Nurses Association
Philippine Nurses Association of United Kingdom
Nursing & Midwifery Council United
Malaysian Nurses Association

Certification and accreditation boards
 Bangladesh Nursing and Midwifery Council (BNMC)
 American Nurses Credentialing Center (ANCC)
 National Certification Corporation (NCC)
 National Council of State Boards of Nursing
 National League for Nursing Accrediting Commission (NLNAC)
 Indian Nursing Council (see also state nursing councils in India)

Honor societies
 Sigma Theta Tau International Honor Society of Nursing

Professional Fraternities
Alpha Tau Delta (collegiate, professional fraternity in nursing)
Chi Eta Phi (collegiate, predominantly African-American professional sorority in nursing)

Specialty organizations
 Academy of Medical-Surgical Nurses (AMSN)
 Academy of Neonatal Nursing
 American Academy of Nurse Practitioners
 American Association of Legal Nurse Consultants
 American Association of Nurse Anesthetists
 American College of Nurse Practitioners
 American Psychiatric Nurses Association
 Association of Nurses in AIDS Care
 Association of periOperative Registered Nurses 
 Association of Women's Health, Obstetric and Neonatal Nurses (AWHONN)
 NANDA
 National Black Nurses Association
 Society of Gynecologic Nurse Oncologists
 Space Nursing Society

Unions
Australian Nursing Federation
Canadian Federation of Nurses' Union
California Nurses Association/National Nurses Organizing Committee (CNA/NNOC)
Democratic Nursing Organisation of South Africa
Finnish Union of Practical Nurses
Manitoba Nurses' Union
National Nurses United (NNU)
New South Wales Nurses and Midwives' Association
New Zealand Nurses Organisation
Pennsylvania Association of Staff Nurses and Allied Professionals
Queensland Nurses' Union
Royal College of Nursing
South African Democratic Nurses' Union
Tennessee Nurses Association
United American Nurses
United Nurses of Alberta
Washington State Nurses Association

Miscellaneous
 American Academy of Nursing
 American Association of Colleges of Nursing
 American Health Care Association
 American Red Cross Nursing Service
 Florence Network for Nursing and Midwifery
 International Council of Nurses
 National Institute of Nursing Research
 National League for Nursing (NLN)
 NPACE
 Nursing Students Without Borders
 National Student Nurses' Association (U.S.)
 Registered Nurses' Association of Ontario

References

Nursing